Crataegus ambitiosa, the Grand Rapids hawthorn, is a species of hawthorn endemic to Michigan, in the Great Lakes region of North America. It has been placed in series Silvicolae.

References

ambitiosa
Flora of Michigan
Endemic flora of the United States
Trees of the Northeastern United States
Trees of the Great Lakes region (North America)
Flora without expected TNC conservation status